Catopta hyrcanus is a moth in the family Cossidae. It is found in Iran, Turkmenistan and Iraq.

References

Natural History Museum Lepidoptera generic names catalog

Catoptinae